Sui Ran, born June 25, 1992) is a Chinese professional basketball player. He currently plays for the Shandong Golden Stars of the Chinese Basketball Association.

He represents China's national basketball team at the 2016 Summer Olympics in Rio de Janeiro.

References

External links
Asia-basket.com Profile
NBADraft.net Profile
REAL GM Profile

1992 births
Living people
Basketball players at the 2016 Summer Olympics
Basketball players from Shanxi
Chinese men's basketball players
Olympic basketball players of China
Sportspeople from Taiyuan
Point guards
Shandong Hi-Speed Kirin players
Shooting guards